William Anthony (Tony) Husband (born 28 August 1950) is a British cartoonist known for black humour. His cartoons appear on greeting cards, and he has a regular cartoon strip in Private Eye entitled Yobs that has been published since the late 1980s. He co-wrote the Round the Bend children's television series, which ran from 1989 to 1991, and was also involved with Hangar 17, which ran from 1992 to 1994. He has won The Cartoon Museum's Pont Award.

Biography 
Husband was born on 28 August 1950 in Blackpool, Lancashire. He is the son of Henry Ronald and Vera Husband. He attended Holy Trinity CE Primary School and Greenfield Street School in Hyde, Greater Manchester.

He married Carole Garner in 1976. They have one son, photographer Paul Husband (born 1978), with whom Tony wrote the book From A Dark Place. Tony became a full-time cartoonist in 1984.

References

External links
 official website

1950 births
British cartoonists
People from Hyde, Greater Manchester
Private Eye contributors
People from Blackpool
British television writers
Living people